Angmendus may have held the role of the first Lord Chancellor (of the Kingdom of Kent), being appointed in 605, during the reign of Æthelberht of Kent (Ethelbert). Other sources suggest that the first ruler to appoint a Chancellor was Edward the Confessor, who is said to have adopted the practice of sealing documents instead of personally signing them.

References

Further reading
 BBC News: End of historic post
 Guardian Unlimited: 1,398 years after Angmendus, the lord chancellor's reign comes to an end

Legendary English people
Lord chancellors of England